Hymenia nigerrimalis is a moth in the family Crambidae (AKA "Crambid Snout Moths"). It was described by George Hampson in 1900. It is found on Christmas Island around 1,550 kilometres north-west of Australia.

References

Moths described in 1900
Spilomelinae